Christopher Lew is a Canadian cinematographer. He is most noted for his work on the 2022 film Riceboy Sleeps, for which he received a Canadian Screen Award nomination for Best Cinematography at the 11th Canadian Screen Awards in 2023.

His other credits have included the films Tito, White Lie, The Archivists and Quickening.

References

External links

Canadian cinematographers
Living people

Year of birth missing (living people)